The 2022 Virginia Cavaliers women's soccer team represented the University of Virginia during the 2022 NCAA Division I women's soccer season. The Cavaliers were led by head coach Steve Swanson, in his twenty third season. They played home games at Klöckner Stadium. This was the team's 37th season playing organized women's college soccer and their 35th playing in the Atlantic Coast Conference.

The team finished 16–4–3 overall and 6–2–2 in ACC play to finish in a tie for fourth place.  As the fourth-seed in the ACC Tournament, they hosted Duke in the First Round and lost 2–1.  They received an at-large bid to the NCAA Tournament, where they were the third-seed in the UCLA Bracket.  They defeated  in the First Round,  in the Second Round, two-seed  in the Round of 16 before falling to eventual champions  in the Quarterfinals to end their season.

Previous season 

The Cavaliers finished the season 18–3–2 and 8–0–2 in ACC play to finish as regular season champions.  As the top seed in the ACC Tournament they received a bye into the Semifinals.  They defeated Clemson before losing to Florida State in the Final.  They received an at-large bid to the NCAA Tournament and were one of the four number one seeds.  They defeated High Point in the First Round and Milwaukee in the Second Round before losing to BYU in the Sweet 16 to end their season.

Offseason

Departures

Incoming Transfers

Recruiting Class

Source:

Squad

Roster

Team management

Source:

Schedule

Source:

|-
!colspan=6 style=""| Exhibition

|-
!colspan=6 style=""| Non-conference Regular season

|-
!colspan=6 style=""| ACC Regular Season

|-
!colspan=6 style=""| ACC Tournament

|-
!colspan=6 style=""| NCAA Tournament

Awards and honors

Rankings

2023 NWSL Draft

Source:

References

Virginia
Virginia
2021
Virginia Cavaliers women's soccer
Virginia